ㅓ (eo) is a vowel of the Korean hangul. It represents the [ʌ] sound as described by IPA. When lengthened, [ʌ:] is actually pronounced closer to [ə].

The Unicode for ㅓ is U+3153.

Stroke order

References 

Hangul jamo
Vowel letters